The 1953 Jacksonville State Gamecocks football team represented Jacksonville State Teachers College (now known as Jacksonville State University) as a member of the Alabama Intercollegiate Conference (AIC) during the 1953 college football season. Led by first-year head coach Ray Wedgeworth, the Gamecocks compiled an overall record of 3–5–1 with a mark of 0–3 in conference play.

Schedule

References

Jacksonville State
Jacksonville State Gamecocks football seasons
Jacksonville State Gamecocks football